The Empress's Dragoons of the Imperial Guard was a heavy cavalry unit formed by Napoleon I through the decree of April 15, 1806. The "dragoon" regiments of the line had distinguished themselves in the German Campaign of 1805, and therefore Napoleon decided to reorganize the cavalry of the Guard and create within it a regiment of dragoon guards. This regiment was colloquially known as the Dragons de l'Impératrice (Empress' Dragoons), in honor of Empress Joséphine. Following the Bourbon Restoration, they were renamed as the Royal Dragoon Corps of France (Corps Royal de Dragons des France) but were disbanded shortly afterwards. The Empress' Dragoons were reformed during the Second Empire (1852-1870).

Composition

The regiment was made up of three squadrons, headed by 60 officers personally selected by Napoleon. The first squadron was to have 296 men, and be made up of "vélites", while the other two were regular squadrons of 476 horsemen. To complete this new unit, each of the 30 dragoon regiments of the line provided 12 men, each with 10 years of service; the brigadier, chasseur, and dragoon line regiments provided the sous-officiers.

The unit's numbers rose to 1269 in 1807 with the addition of two new squadrons, and on December 9, 1813, it was attached to the Guard's 3rd regiment of éclaireurs.

Campaigns

The Dragons de la Garde Imperiale distinguished themselves at the battle of Friedland (1807), and at the battle of Wagram (1809). They suffered heavy losses at the battle of Maloyaroslavets and at the battle of Berezina (1812). They participated in the battles of Leipzig and Hanau (1813) and captured 18 guns at the battle of Saint-Dizier (1814). Their last battle was Marshal Ney's charge at Waterloo (1815).

Uniform

The dragoons' uniform and weaponry was the same as those of the Guard's horse grenadiers, only in green rather than blue, and (in place of the bonnet à poil) a copper dragoon helmet with a hanging mane in the Neo-Greek Minerve style, with a red plume.

The trumpeters wore a light blue tunic with white lapels and crimson turn backs and collar. The mane on their helmets was white and the plume was light blue. They rode grey horses. They also had a white uniform for parade, consisting of a white coat with light blue lapels and collar lined with gold.

The Dragoon Guards wore green coats with white lapels and red turnbacks. They also wore aurore (light orange) aiguilettes and epaulettes. They wore brass helmets with a long black mane, a simulated leopard fur turban and a red plume (white plume for the highest officers). They rode chestnut horses.

References

External links 
 Uniform of the Empress' Dragoons, in 1815, on "Les uniformes pendant la campagne des Cent Jours"

Regiments of Napoleon I's Imperial Guard
Dragoon regiments of France
Military units and formations established in 1806
Military units and formations disestablished in 1815